Kinetic theory may refer to:

 Kinetic theory of gases, an account of gas properties in terms of motion and interaction of submicroscopic particles in gases
 Phonon, explaining properties of solids in terms of quantal collection and interactions of submicroscopic particles
 Free electron model, a model for the behavior of charge carriers in a metallic solid
 Kirkwood–Buff solution theory, a theory for solutions linking macroscopic (bulk) properties to microscopic (molecular) details
 Kinematics, the part of mechanics that describes the motion of points, particles, bodies, and systems of bodies, without reference to the forces, energies and interactions that govern their motion